The Osprey Osprey 2, also known as the Pereira Osprey 2 after its designer, is an amphibious sport aircraft designed for homebuilding. Plans have been sold since the mid-1970s. George Pereira designed the Osprey 2 to address the two most frequent criticisms of his Osprey I aircraft: its lack of a passenger seat and its inability to operate from dry land. An exercise that began as a series of modifications to the original design in January 1972 eventually turned into a complete redesign of the aircraft, with the resulting Osprey 2 flying in April 1973.

Design and development
Like the original Osprey, the Osprey 2 is a mid-wing cantilever monoplane with a flying boat hull and a single engine mounted pusher-fashion in a nacelle mounted above the fuselage on struts. A passenger seat is provided side-by-side with the pilot and the cabin is fully enclosed. Retractable tricycle undercarriage is provided for land operations, the main units of which fold into the undersides of the wings. Construction throughout is of wood and skinned in plywood. Some of the hull contours are formed with polyurethane foam covered in fiberglass.

The aircraft is designed so that it may be constructed by amateur builders with restricted space available – Pereira's prototype was built in a workspace 16 ft × 26 ft (4.8 m × 7.9 m) and took 1,300 hours to complete. To simplify construction, no molds are required, and even the canopy is formed by a simple bend in an acrylic sheet without any compound curves.

Osprey markets the aircraft as sets of plans rather than kits, and had sold over 1,000 copies by 1985. Over 500 examples have been completed and flown.

Aircraft on display
EAA AirVenture Museum
Pima Air & Space Museum
Aerospace Museum of California

Specifications

See also

Notes

References

 
 
 
 
 
 

1970s United States sport aircraft
Homebuilt aircraft
Flying boats
Amphibious aircraft
Single-engined pusher aircraft
Osprey 2
Mid-wing aircraft
Aircraft first flown in 1973